Laker is a surname. Notable people with the name include:

Barbara Laker, American journalist
Freddie Laker (1922–2006), English airline entrepreneur
Freddie A. Laker, British-American entrepreneur
Jim Laker (1922–1986), English cricketer
Peter Laker (1926–2014), English cricketer and journalist
Tim Laker (born 1969), American baseball coach and former player

See also
Victoria Meyer-Laker (born 1988), British professional rower 
Lake (surname)